Spigelia anthelmia, the West Indian pinkroot, wormbush, or wormgrass, is a species of flowering plant in the family Loganiaceae. It is native to Mexico, Central America, the Caribbean, Florida, and northern South America through to Bolivia and Brazil, and it has been widely introduced to other tropical locales, including western and west-central Africa, India, Sri Lanka, Indonesia, Thailand, Peninsular Malaysia, Hainan, and the Bismarck Archipelago. Highly poisonous, it is used as a vermifuge against intestinal worms.

References

Loganiaceae
Flora of Mexico
Flora of Central America
Flora of the Caribbean
Flora of western South America
Flora of northern South America
Flora of Brazil
Plants described in 1753
Taxa named by Carl Linnaeus
Flora without expected TNC conservation status